The Forum Vinarium was the wine forum venalium of early Ancient Rome. It was located in the area of the modern quartiere Testaccio, between the Aventine Hill and the Tiber.

A series of inscriptions from outside the walls of Rome connects the Forum Vinarium to a group of money lenders (argentarii).

References

Vinarium